Ma Yuxi (born March 21, 1979) is a Paralympic athlete from China competing mainly in category T37 sprint events.

He competed in the 2008 Summer Paralympics in Beijing, China.  There he won a silver medal in the men's 100 metres - T37 event, a silver medal in the men's 4 x 100 metre relay - T35-38 event, a bronze medal in the men's 200 metres - T37 event and a bronze medal in the men's Long jump - F37/38 event

External links
 

Paralympic athletes of China
Athletes (track and field) at the 2008 Summer Paralympics
Paralympic silver medalists for China
Paralympic bronze medalists for China
Chinese male sprinters
Chinese male long jumpers
1979 births
Living people
Medalists at the 2008 Summer Paralympics
Medalists at the 2012 Summer Paralympics
Athletes (track and field) at the 2012 Summer Paralympics
Paralympic medalists in athletics (track and field)
21st-century Chinese people
Paralympic sprinters
Paralympic long jumpers
Medalists at the 2010 Asian Para Games